Michael Gary Booth (born 12 February 2001) is a South African cricketer. He made his Twenty20 debut for KwaZulu-Natal Inland in the 2019–20 CSA Provincial T20 Cup on 13 September 2019.

Booth was educated at Hilton College and Durham University.

References

External links
 

2001 births
Living people
South African cricketers
KwaZulu-Natal Inland cricketers
Place of birth missing (living people)
Alumni of Durham University
Alumni of Hilton College (South Africa)